Zilya Valeeva (Zilya Rakhimyanovna Valeeva; born 15 October 1952 in Ufa, Republic of Bashkortostan Russia) — public figure and politician in Republic of Tatarstan, honored cultural worker of the Russian Federation, PhD in philosophical studies (2010).

For 20 years, during 1992–2012, she acts as one of the first tier high-officials and the most influential female politician of the Republic of Tatarstan, traditionally noted as one of patriarchal Muslim region in Russian Federation. She actively represents the region on international level.

Currently Zilya Valeeva works as the Director of State Museum Historic and Architectural Complex of the Kazan Kremlin, also she is the chairwoman for public organization The Women of Tatarstan, chairwoman for Commission of the Republic of Tatarstan on UNESCO

Biography 

1970–1980 — Correspondent, later Head of Literature and Art Department of the republican youth newspaper Leninets (Ufa);

1980–1982 — Correspondent of the  newspaper (Kazan);

1982–1990 — Correspondent, Head of Department on Social Issues at Sovetskaya Tatariya newspaper, which was later renamed  (Kazan);

1990–1992— Editor on politics at  newspaper (Kazan);

1992–1995 — First Deputy Chairman of the Supreme Soviet of Republic of Tatarstan;

1995–1999 — Deputy Chairman of State Council of the Republic of Tatarstan;

1999–2001 — Minister of press, broadcasting and mass media of the Republic of Tatarstan;

2001–2005 — Deputy Prime Minister of the Republic of Tatarstan;

2005–2011 — Deputy Prime Minister - Minister of Culture of the Republic of Tatarstan;

March 2011–May 2012 — Deputy Prime Minister of the Republic of Tatarstan;

Since May 17, 2012 — Director of State Museum Historic and Architectural Complex of the Kazan Kremlin.

Awards 
The Medal for Valorous Labor;
The Letter of Honor of Republic of Tatarstan  (2002);
Medal "In Commemoration of the 300th Anniversary of Saint Petersburg" (2003);
Medal "In Commemoration of the 1000th Anniversary of Kazan" (2005);
Letter of appreciation on behalf of the President of the Republic of Tatarstan (2007);
Order of Friendship (2008);
State Russian Federation award on the Culture recipient (2009).

References 

1952 births
Living people
Politicians from Ufa
Moscow State University alumni
Russian women in politics
Politicians of Tatarstan